Arienti is an Italian surname. Notable people with the surname include:

Luigi Arienti, (1937-), Italian race cyclist.
Stefano Arienti, (1961-), Italian artist.
Héctor Arienti, (1957- ) Argentine Scientific
Carlo Arienti (1800-1873), Italian painter.

Zenón Arienti, (1879-1949), Swiss. Builder, entrepreneur in Argentina
Luis Alberto Arienti, Argentine medical doctor
Carolina Arienti Lattanzi, (1771-1818), Italian writer, journalist, poet, and early figure in the Italian feminist movement.
Guido Novak von Arienti, (1859-1928), Austro-Hungarian general
Sabadino degli Arienti, (1445-1510), Italian humanist, author, poet and prose writer.

References

Italian-language surnames